Katie Heaney (born 1986) is a former BuzzFeed editor, senior writer for The Cut, and author. Her books include Never Have I Ever, Dear Emma, Would You Rather?, Girl Crushed, and The Year I Stopped Trying.

Career 
Heaney's first book, written while she was working as an editor at BuzzFeed, was Never Have I Ever: My Life (So Far) Without a Date, published in 2014. The memoir chronicles her life up til age 25 and recounts how she had not, before that point, had a boyfriend. In 2016, Heaney's modernization of Jane Austen's Emma was published. In 2018, Heaney published a second memoir, Would You Rather?: A Memoir of Growing Up and Coming Out. Would You Rather? deals with Heaney's path to coming out and realizing her sexuality. Her first YA novel, Girl Crushed, was published in 2020. Her second YA novel, The Year I Stopped Trying, was published in 2021.

Personal life 
Heaney was born and raised in St. Paul and Shoreview, Minnesota. She came out as gay at age 28 in 2015. From 2019 to 2023, Heaney was married to Lydia Jackson. She now lives in Los Angeles.

Works 

Never Have I Ever: My Life (So Far) Without a Date (2014)
Dear Emma (2016)
Public Relations (2017 – with Arianna Rebolini)
Would You Rather?: A Memoir of Growing Up and Coming Out (2018)
Girl Crushed (2020)
The Year I Stopped Trying (2021)

References

External links
katieheaney.com

Lesbian memoirists
BuzzFeed people
Writers from Minnesota
American LGBT novelists
Living people
American memoirists
American young adult novelists
1986 births
American lesbian writers